Granata lyrata, common name the elegant stomatella, is a species of sea snail, a marine gastropod mollusk in the family Chilodontidae.

Description
The height of the shell attains 15 mm. The thin but solid shell has a depressed-globose shape. It is pinkish, with dots of deep brown or black and white on the spiral
riblets. The spire is short. The sutures are deeply impressed. The surface of whorls are encircled by narrow spiral lirae, separated by spaces about 1 mm wide (in a specimen of 15 mm diam.). These interstices are closely latticed by oblique raised striae, and bear 
on the last part of the whorl from one to three minute spiral interstitial threads. There are about 16 principal threads on the body whorl of the largest specimen, but this character is extremely variable. The three whorls are convex with the last whorl descending. The large aperture is very oblique, rounded-oval, nacreous, iridescent and slightly sulcate within, corresponding to the sculpture of the outside. The arcuate columella is narrow and  flattened.

Distribution
This marine species occurs off Japan and the Philippines.

References

External links
 To Barcode of Life (2 barcodes)
 To Encyclopedia of Life
 To GenBank (6 nucleotides; 3 proteins)
 To World Register of Marine Species
 

lyrata
Gastropods described in 1890